Teen Beach Movie is a Disney Channel Original Movie that premiered on July 19, 2013, on Disney Channel, starring Ross Lynch and Maia Mitchell. Directed by Jeffrey Hornaday, Teen Beach Movie was filmed in Puerto Rico. It was the only Disney Channel Original Movie to premiere in 2013. A sequel, Teen Beach 2, premiered on June 26, 2015.

Plot

Brady and McKenzie (Mack) are surfing near her grandfather's beach hut in Waikiki. Mack then walks in on her grandfather and Brady watching their favorite film, a 1960s musical titled Wet Side Story, where surfers and motorcycle bikers battle for the privilege to hang out at Big Momma's beachside restaurant. When Mack's aunt comes by, she explains to Brady that before her mother died, Mack's aunt promised Mack's mom that Mack would attend a private school, and she is leaving the next day. Mack asserts that although going is not her choice, she feels it is what she has to do since it is what her mother would want. She tells Brady they will have to break up.

Before Mack leaves, she decides to surf a 40-foot wave that is about to hit the beach on her family's special surfboard. Alarmed, Brady gets on a jet ski and goes after Mack, but they both get swept away, eventually landing on another beach. They soon realize that they have somehow been swept inside the Wet Side Story film. Seizing the moment, Brady joins the film's cast in singing, to Mack's dismay ("Surf Crazy"). Brady relents and informs Mack that there will be a storm and giant wave that should bring them back home at the end of the film. They go into Big Momma's and introduce themselves to the surfers just before the bikers appear and start the surf and turf war ("Cruisin' for a Bruisin'"). Mack and Brady are then invited to come to a party at Big Momma's later that night.

That evening, Mack and Brady are arguing while the film's female lead, Lela (one of the biker girls), is singing on stage ("Falling for Ya"). Tanner, the male lead (one of the surfer boys), falls in love with Mack after she bumps into him, and Brady catches Lela when she falls off the stage. This interferes with the film's plot, in which Lela falls into Tanner's arms, not Brady's. They decide to make Tanner and Lela fall in love to fix things. Brady also tells Mack about the villains of the film, Les Camembert and Dr. Fusion, who are going to use a machine to affect the weather to make the surfers and bikers leave so they can control Big Momma's and turn it into a beach resort.

Lela and Tanner express their love for Brady and Mack, who subtly suggest to them that there may be someone else they are really meant to be with ("Meant to Be"). That night Mack joins Lela and the other biker girls for a sleepover, while Brady hangs out with Tanner and the surfer boys at Big Momma's. While talking about love, Brady and Mack's modern relationship views comes into conflict with those of the 1960s ("Like Me"); they fail to make any progress on getting Lela and Tanner together. The next night, Lela tells Mack that she would like to surf.

Mack and Brady realize that they are morphing into the film when Mack falls into the water and her hair does not get wet. They then begin to spontaneously sing and are unable to stop ("Can't Stop Singing"). They are then captured by Les Camembert and Dr. Fusion and taken to the villains' lighthouse lair.

Lela and Tanner fall in love with each other and soon realize that their friends have been kidnapped. They convince the bikers and surfers to team up and save Mack and Brady. Meanwhile, Mack admits that she is glad that she ended up in the film and does not have to attend private school. When Mack says she thinks Lela is braver than her, Brady denies that, saying that Mack is the bravest girl he knows.

The surfers and bikers free Mack and Brady and destroy the villains' machine. The film's plot returns to normal, and Mack and Brady realize they are able to return home. After saying goodbye to everyone, Mack and Brady get on the surfboard and returns to the real world, where no time has passed since they left. Mack successfully surfs the 40-foot wave. Mack's aunt is upset about her delaying their flight but accepts her decision to spend the rest of the year with Brady. Mack and Brady celebrate by singing on the beach ("Surf's Up").

In a post-credits scene, Lela, Tanner, Butchy, Seacat, Cheechee and Giggles wash up into the real world. A modern-day surfer thinks they are lost and allows them to use his cell phone, which they marvel at as they attempt to use it.

Cast

 Ross Lynch as Brady
 Maia Mitchell as McKenzie (Mack)
 Grace Phipps as Lela
 Garrett Clayton as Tanner
 John DeLuca as Butchy 
 Chrissie Fit as Cheechee
 Suzanne Cryer as Aunt Antoinette
 Barry Bostwick as Big Poppa
 Kevin Chamberlin as Dr. Fusion
 Steve Valentine as Les Camembert
 Jordan Fisher as Seacat
 Kent Boyd as Rascal
 Mollee Gray as Giggles
 William Loftis as Lugnut
 Jessica Lee Keller as Struts
 LaVon Fisher-Wilson as Big Momma

Production
The script was written by Vince Marcello, Mark Landry and Robert Horn, from a story by Marcello and Landry. Pre-production of the film began in January 2012. Teen Beach Movie was the third Disney Channel Original Movie filmed in Puerto Rico, the first two being Princess Protection Program and Wizards of Waverly Place: The Movie.

On March 28, 2012, local Puerto Rican press reported on the filming, which took place on the island. Most beach scenes took place in Fajardo on the east coast of the island, including the beach house of the Governor of Puerto Rico, while indoor scenes, such as McKenzie's bedroom, a restaurant, and a kitchen, were filmed inside an undisclosed warehouse in Bayamón. Mariella Pérez Serrano, who was executive director of the Puerto Rico Film Corporation at the time, said Disney had spent about eight million dollars to film the production in Puerto Rico when the film was titled Teen Beach Musical at the time.

The film's soundtrack features ten original songs composed in rhythms of surf rock, Motown R&B, rockabilly and pop.

Teen Beach Movie was the only Disney Channel Original Movie that was released in 2013.

The film was dedicated to beach party film star Annette Funicello, who died on April 8, 2013. A memorial message preceding the start of the film read, "In memory of Disney legend Annette Funicello, the world's most beloved beach movie star."

Reception

Critical reception
Teen Beach Movie received generally favorable reviews from critics. The review aggregator website Rotten Tomatoes reported an 86% approval rating based on 7 reviews, while Metacritic reported a score of 54 based on 6 reviews. Entertainment Weekly gave the film a C grade, saying "The good news? Two tunes in this attempt to reverse-engineer a new High School Musical are decent...But the rest is dull as sand." Brian Lowry from Variety wrote, "It’s too bad the makers didn’t do a slightly better job casting the key roles, but taken on its own terms the (overlong) 95-minute Disney Channel original plays like a brightly colored beach blanket, albeit one that’s a little rough around its sandy edges."

Ratings
The premiere in the United Kingdom had 597,000 viewers. The United States premiere just hours later received 8.4 million viewers during its first airing and 13.5 million viewers in L+7, becoming the second-highest rated Disney Channel Original Movie. The Dance Along version on July 27, 2013, garnered 3.7 million viewers. In Canada, the movie delivered 818,000 viewers. The Australian premiere had 113,000 viewers.

Broadcast
The film originally premiered on July 19, 2013, in the United States, Canada, the UK, and Ireland on Disney Channel. It premiered on August 4, 2013, in Southeast Asia and on August 9, 2013, in Australia and New Zealand, both on Disney Channel.

Streaming 
It's available for streaming currently on Disney+ and Disney+ Hotstar.

Home Media 
Teen Beach Movie was released on DVD on July 16, 2013. According to The Numbers, the domestic DVD sales are $12,505,311.

Soundtrack

The soundtrack album for the film was released on July 15, 2013 by Walt Disney Records. The album was the fourth best-selling soundtrack of 2013 in the United States with 407,000 copies sold for the year. The album peaked at number three on the Billboard 200 chart. As of July 2015, it has sold 462,000 copies in the United States.

Track listing

 The song "Oxygen" was originally recorded by Hoku from her 2000 self-titled album.

Certifications

Sequel

On April 27, 2014, the sequel, Teen Beach 2 was announced as slated to premiere in 2015 on Disney Channel, with production set for July 2014 in Puerto Rico. Ross Lynch, Maia Mitchell, Grace Phipps, Garrett Clayton and John DeLuca reprised their roles in the sequel. The remaining actors who portray the bikers and surfers, Jordan Fisher, Chrissie Fit, William Loftis, Kent Boyd, Jessica Lee Keller and Mollee Gray, are also confirmed to return for the sequel. The sequel revolves around the characters from Wet Side Story after the first film's post-credits scene, when they were transported into the real world. Teen Beach 2 premiered June 26, 2015, with 5.8 million viewers.

References

External links

 
 
 

2010s musical comedy films
2010s parody films
2010s teen comedy films
2013 in American television
2013 television films
2013 films
American musical comedy films
American parody films
American teen comedy films
American teen musical films
Beach party films
Disney Channel Original Movie films
Musical television films
Films directed by Jeffrey Hornaday
Films set in 1962
Films shot in Puerto Rico
American surfing films
Films about vacationing
2010s English-language films
2010s American films